The People Walker is a service for hire to walk with individuals  and provide motivation through conversation and companionship. The service was launched in Los Angeles, California during 2016 by actor Chuck McCarthy when he was in-between acting jobs and needed money. He initially advertised the business by posting fliers by asking questions like  “Need Motivation to walk”, “Scared to walk alone at night?”, “Don’t like walking alone at all?”, and “Don’t want people to see you walking alone and just assume you have no friends?” etc which led to people contacting him to schedule walks. McCarthy describes the walks as “therapeutic” for both him and his clients. After receiving a large number of requests, McCarthy hired staff and began offering more locations.

Website 
On their website, the mission of The People Walker is further explained. They explain why they walk, why sitting is dangerous for the body, the physical benefits of walking, the mental benefits of walking, and the personal benefits of walking. The website also lists the profiles of the available walkers for hire, which includes a video of the walker introducing themselves.

References

External links
 Official website

2016 establishments in California